Kitty Anderson is an intersex activist from Iceland. She is a co-chair of European intersex organization OII Europe, a co-founder of Intersex Iceland, and chairman of the board of the Icelandic Human Rights Centre. She has been described as a "leading voice of the intersex movement in Europe."

Background 

Kitty Anderson was born with androgen insensitivity. She found out when she was 13, but only found out she was born with internal testes when she was aged 22. Anderson has reported that her "mother was told to lie" to her until she was aged 13.

Activism 

Anderson co-founded Intersex Iceland in 2014, and currently serves as its chairperson. She is co-chair and spokesperson of OII Europe and chairperson of the board of the Icelandic Human Rights Centre. She has also served on the board of Samtökin '78, Iceland's national queer organization, and the national Ministry of Welfare Queer Committee from 2014-2016. Anderson has spoken against secrecy and shame associated with intersex:

She also campaigns against intersex medical interventions. In an interview with NIKK, Anderson has stated that "surgeries will continue until we get a law that prohibits them".

Anderson has presented to the Council of Europe Committee on Bioethics, and speaks at a range of conferences, media, and human rights institutions across Scandinavia and Europe.

In 2015, Anderson campaigned to change terminology in the biology curriculum in Icelandic schools, and dictionaries, after finding out that the word intersex was being translated into Icelandic as "freak". The publisher of the school text later apologized.

References 

Living people
Intersex women
Intersex rights activists
Icelandic LGBT rights activists
Year of birth missing (living people)